The 2006 Pro Tour season was the eleventh season of the Magic: The Gathering Pro Tour. On 18 December 2005 the season began with parallel Grand Prixs in Lille and Charlotte. It ended on 3 December 2006 with the conclusion of the 2006 World Championship in Paris. The season consisted of 22 Grand Prixs and 5 Pro Tours, held in Honolulu, Prague, Charleston, Kobe, and Paris. At the end of the season Shouta Yasooka from Japan was proclaimed Pro Player of the year. At the Worlds in Paris the second class of the Hall of Fame was inducted. The inductees were Bob Maher, Jr., Dave Humpherys, Raphaël Lévy, Gary Wise, and Rob Dougherty.

Grand Prixs – Lille, Charlotte, Hasselt, Richmond, Dortmund 

GP Lille (18–19 December)
Format: Legacy
Attendance: 939
 Helmut Summersberger
 Daniel Krutil
 Nicholas Labarre
 Luca Verdiani
 Martin Brenner
 Loïc Le Briand
 Max Bracht
 Nicolas Francois

GP Charlotte (18–19 December)
Format: Extended
Attendance: 456
 Michael Krumb
 Alex Majlaton
 Kyle Goodman
 David Shiels
 Antonino De Rosa
 Alan Hubbard
 Chris Boozer
 Thomas LaPille

GP Hasselt (28–29 January)
Format: Limited
Attendance: 1070
 Sam Gomersall
 Julien Goron
 Maurice Palijama
 Ziga Fritz
 Helge Nelson
 Dimitri Reinderman
 Quentin Martin
 Francois Moreau

GP Richmond (4–5 February)
Format: Limited
Attendance: 558
 Richard Hoaen
 Jonathan Sonne
 Adam Chambers
 John Fiorillo
 Eugene Harvey
 Taylor Webb
 Gerry Thompson
 Michael Pinnegar

GP Dortmund (18–19 February)
Format: Limited
Attendance: 1029
 David Brucker
 Julien Goron
 Mathias Wigge
 Marco Rothaupt
 Dennis Grudowski
 Julien Nuijten
 Olivier Ruel
 Stefan Rentzsch

Pro Tour – Honolulu (3–5 March 2006) 

Mark Herberholz won Pro Tour Honolulu piloting a green/red aggro-deck. He defeated Craig Jones in the finals. The final eight included both Ruel brothers, Antoine and Olivier. Notably absent from the Top 8 were the Japanese players after thirteen consecutive final day appearances.

Tournament data 
Prize pool: $240,245
Players: 410
Format: Standard
Head Judge: John Shannon

Top 8

Final standings

Pro Player of the year standings

Grand Prixs – Manila, Cardiff, Madison, Hamamatsu, Barcelona 

GP Manila (18–19 March)
Format: Limited
Attendance: 368
 James Porter
 Jiro Francisco
 Cynic Kim
 Bo Sun
 Jake Hart
 Felix Gonzales
 Takuya Osawa
 Dominic Ortega

GP Cardiff (25–26 March)
Format: Limited
Attendance: 370
 Martin Dingler
 Wesimo Al-Bacha
 Roel van Heeswijk
 Julian Jardine
 Quentin Martin
 Bram Snepvangers
 Raphaël Lévy
 Antoine Ruel

GP Madison (25–26 March)
Format: Team Unified Standard
Attendance: 456 (152 teams)
1. Faddy Josh
 Brian Ziegler
 Tim Bulger
 Takanobu Sato
2. Free James Beeton
 Kyle Goodman
 Mark Ioli
 Benjamin Lundquist
3. 4815162342
 Richard Hoaen
 Eric Froehlich
 Bob Maher, Jr.
4. Cedric Philips Stole My Bike
 John Pelcak
 Chris McDaniel
 Jonathan Sonne

GP Hamamatsu (8–9 April)
Format: Team Unified Standard
Attendance: 495 (165 teams)
1. Tanii Monogatari
 Kotatsu Saitou
 Takahiro Katayama
 Yuusuke Tanii
2. Stardust Crusader
 Akira Asahara
 Masaya Kitayama
 Shouta Yasooka
3. Limit Break
 Takuya Oosawa
 Ryou Ogura
 Itaru Ishida
4. Kiosk
 Takashi Ishihara
 Shuhei Itou
 Daisuke Saitou

GP Barcelona (8–9 April)
Format: Limited
Attendance: 1208
 Helmut Summersberger
 Raphaël Lévy
 Jelger Wiegersma
 Johan Sadeghpour
 Olivier Ruel
 Aniol Alcaraz
 Jean Charles Salvin
 Sebastian Aljiaj

Pro Tour – Prague (5–7 May 2006) 

Takuya Osawa won Pro Tour Prague, defeating Aaron Brackmann in the finals. In a Top 8 of rather unknown players Shuhei Nakamura was the only one to have made it to the final stage of a PT before.

Tournament data 
Prize pool: $240,245
Players: 415
Format: Booster Draft (Ravnica-Guildpact-Dissension)
Head Judge: Jaap Brouwer

Top 8

Final standings

Pro Player of the year standings

Grand Prixs – Torino, Toronto, Kuala Lumpur 

GP Torino (3–4 June)
Format: Limited
Attendance: 656
 Nico Bohny
 Antoine Ruel
 Bram Snepvangers
 Klaus Jöns
 Marco Lombardi
 Guillaume Wafo-Tapa 
 Giacomo Mallamaci 
 Pierre Canali 

GP Toronto (3–4 June)
Format: Limited
Attendance: 504
 Antonino De Rosa
 Jonathan Sonne
 Kyle Sanchez 
 Mark Lovin
 John Fiorillo
 Brad Taulbee
 Jay Jiang 
 Jelger Wiegersma

GP Kuala Lumpur (3–4 June)
Format: Limited
Attendance:316
 Kenji Tsumura
 Osamu Fujita
 Quentin Martin
 Ruud Warmenhoven
 Terry Soh
 Shouta Yasooka
 Cynic Kim
 Itaru Ishida

Pro Tour – Charleston (16–18 June 2006) 

The Japanese team "Kajiharu80" won Pro Tour Charleston, defeating the Brazilian team "Raaala Pumba" in the final. "Kajiharu80" consisted of Tomohiro Kaji, Shouta Yasooka, and Tomoharu Saitou. With 525 competitors in 175 teams Pro Tour Charleston was the biggest Pro Tour ever. It was also the only Team Constructed Pro Tour ever.

Tournament data 

Players: 525 (175 teams)
Prize Pool: $234,000
Format: 3-Person Team Block Constructed (Ravnica, Guildpact, Dissension)
Head Judge: Sheldon Menery

Top 4

Final standings

Grand Prixs – Toulouse, St. Louis, Malmo, Hiroshima, Phoenix, Sydney, Athens 

GP Toulouse (24–25 June)
Format: Limited
Attendance: 674
 Kenji Tsumura
 Marijn Lybaert
 Shuhei Nakamura
 Adrian Olivera
 Julien Soum
 Olivier Ruel
 Shouta Yasooka
 Thomas Didierjean

GP St. Louis (22–23 July)
Format: Limited
Attendance:466
 Shuhei Nakamura
 Zac Hill
 Kenji Tsumura
 Chris Fennell
 Alex Kim
 Pierre Mondon
 Dalton King
 Jeremy Kunkel

GP Malmo (22–23 July)
Format: Limited
Attendance: 539
 Wessel Oomens
 Vasilis Fatouros
 Wilco Pinkster
 Axel Berglund
 Jelger Wiegersma
 Kamiel Cornelissen
 André Coimbra
 Asbjørn Fallesen

GP Hiroshima (19–20 August)
Format: Limited
Attendance: 417
 Shuhei Nakamura
 André Coimbra
 Takahiro Suzuki
 Basam Tebet
 Julien Nuijten
 Kentarou Nonaka
 Ichirou Shimura
 Yuusuke Wakisaka

GP Phoenix (2–3 September)
Format: Limited
Attendance: 387
 Carlos Romão
 Sean Inoue
 Raphaël Lévy
 Sam Stein
 Geoffrey Siron
 Gadiel Szleifer
 André Coimbra
 Shu Kumuro

GP Sydney (7–8 October)
Format: Limited
Attendance: 213
 James Zhang
 Anatoli Lightfoot
 Tomoharu Saitou
 Jeremy Neeman
 Steven Aplin
 Takuya Oosawa
 Shouta Yasooka
 Hugh Glanville

GP Athens (14–15 October)
Format: Limited
Attendance: 469
 Sebastian Aljiaj
 Vincent Lemoine
 Marcio Carvalho
 Guillaume Wafo-Tapa
 David Brucker
 Antoine Ruel
 Evangelos Papatsarouchas
 Aaron Brackmann

Pro Tour – Kobe (20–22 October 2006) 

German Jan-Moritz Merkel won Pro Tour Kobe. It was his first appearance at a Pro Tour.

Tournament data 

Players: 388
Prize Pool: $240,245
Format: Booster Draft (Time Spiral)
Head Judge: John Shannon

Top 8

Final standings

Grand Prixs – New Jersey, Yamagata 

GP New Jersey (11–12 November)
Format: Limited
Attendance: 913
 Guillaume Cardin
 Richard Hoaen
 Timothy Aten
 Jason Imperiale
 Gerry Thompson
 John Pelcak
 Andrew Stokinger
 Shouta Yasooka

GP Yamagata (18–19 November)
Format: Limited
Attendance: 359
 Takihiro Suzuki
 Takeshi Ozawa
 Jelger Wiegersma
 Katsuhiro Mori
 Richard Hoaen
 Antoine Ruel
 Ryo Ogura
 Yuu Murakami

2006 World Championships – Paris (29 November – 3 December 2006) 

The tournament began with the Hall of Fame induction of Bob Maher, Jr., Dave Humpherys Raphaël Lévy, Gary Wise, and Rob Dougherty. In an all-Japanese final Makihito Mihara defeated Ryo Ogura. The Dutch team of Kamiel Cornelissen, Julien Nuijten, and Robert van Medevoort won the team finals against Japan.

Tournament data 

Prize pool: $255,245 (individual) + $210,000 (national teams)
Players: 356
Formats: Standard, Booster Draft (Time Spiral), Extended
Head Judge: Jaap Brouwer, Jason Ness

Top 8

Final standings

National team competition 

  The Netherlands (Julien Nuijten, Kamiel Cornelissen, Robert van Medevoort)
  Japan (Hidenori Katayama, Katsuhiro Mori, Shuhei Yamamoto)

Pro Player of the year final standings 

After the World Championship Shouta Yasooka was awarded the Pro Player of the year title.

References 

Magic: The Gathering professional events